An Aviation Area Forecast (FA or ARFOR) was a message product of the National Weather Service (NWS) in the United States. It has been replaced by Graphic Area Forecasts, or GFA, in 2017.

There are also weather charts forecast like SIGWX. FA encompasses the weather conditions over a large regional area and is considered one of the better sources of information for en-route weather. It is also beneficial in verifying airport conditions at airports that do not have terminal aerodrome forecasts. FA's were issued three times daily in all 48 contiguous states of the United States, and modified as required. The NWS offices also issued FA's for Alaska and Hawaii, but Alaska used a slightly different format.

Description
Area forecasts (FA's) were issued 3 times daily, valid for 18 hours (12-hour forecast, plus 6-hour categorical outlook), and cover an area the size of several states

Description of content:
	Visibility is always stated in statute miles (SM)
       Times are issued in UTC (Coordinated Universal Time)
	Comprise four sections
a.	A communications and header section
i.	Issue time of forecast
ii.	Valid times of the synopsis and the visual flight rules (VFR) CLOUDS/WX sections
iii.	Area of coverage
b.	A precautionary statement section
i.	Warns users to check the AIRMET section for IFR and/or mountain obscuration
ii.	Describes the hazards associated with all thunderstorm
iii.	Reminds users that all altitudes are given in MSL, unless noted as AGL or CIG (ceiling)
c.	A synopsis section
i.	Brief summary of the location and movement of fronts, pressure systems and circulation patterns for an 18-hour period
ii.	References to low ceilings, reduced visibility and/or strong winds may be included
d.	A VFR CLOUDS/WX section
i.	Contains a 12-hour specific forecast, followed by a 6-hour categorical outlook
ii.	Broken down into geographical areas, and/or states
iii.	Describes cloud and weather affecting VFR flight operations, including precipitation, thunderstorms, and sustained surface winds 20 Kts or greater.  Also includes visibility when the forecast to visibility is between 3 and 6 SM and/or obstructions to visibility

Some abbreviations that are used in FA's include:
OCNL	Occasional	>50% chance for <1/2 of the forecast period
ISOLD	Isolated	Single cells
WDLY SCT	Widely scattered	<25% of the area affected
SCT	Scattered	Areas of 25% to 54% of the area affected
NMRS	Numerous	>55% of the area affected
WDSPRD	Widespread	>55% of the area affected

Status of an FA can be:
AMD	Amended	Includes AIRMETs, SIGMETs, and Convective SIGMETs
COR	Corrected	
RTD	Delayed

References

External links
 A handy list of common abbreviations used in Area Forecasts
 
 

Weather forecasting